Hart (Heart) is the fourth album by Dutch language rapper Brainpower. It was released April 21, 2008 on Lyric Recordings, together with his fifth album Hard (Hard) and contains the single "Eigen Werk" ("Own Work"). Hart and Hard are two albums sold together, where Hart represents the sensitive side of Brainpower with songs about his mother ("Ode Aan Me Mama" / "Ode To My Momma"), his father ("Zo Vader Zo Zoon" / "Like Father Like Son") and his girlfriend ("Als Jij Er Niet Bent" / "If You're Not Around" featuring his girlfriend Hind).

Hip Hop veteran Brainpower separates his more melodious material from his famous 'braggin' & boast' side.

Hart is based around themes like 'Anger', 'Fear', 'Hope', 'Pain' and 'Luck' and different sorts of love. The notion/word 'Hart' ('Heart') is the concept throughout. There are guest performances from Freek de Jonge, Hind and Candy Dulfer to DJs TLM and All Star Fresh.

Track listing

* Only scratches.

Album singles

2008 albums
Brainpower albums